The Reserve at Savannah Harbor is the first neighborhood community on Hutchinson Island, Georgia, a river island located directly across the Savannah River from historic downtown Savannah, Georgia and now being developed with commercial and residential components. The Talmadge Bridge and Causeway connects Hutchinson Island with Savannah to the south and South Carolina to the north. A five-minute ferry service operated by Chatham Area Transit also services the island from historic River Street in Savannah.

Geography of Savannah, Georgia